My Precious: Shizuka Sings Songs of Miyuki (stylized as "MY PRECIOUS -Shizuka sings songs of Miyuki-") is the second cover album by Japanese singer Shizuka Kudo. It was released on August 20, 2008, through Pony Canyon. The album features eleven covers of songs originally penned and performed by Miyuki Nakajima, chosen by Kudo from Nakajima's exhaustive catalog. The record also includes, as bonus tracks, three songs of Kudo's that were written and composed by Nakajima: "Gekijō" (1996), "Setsu Getsu Ka" (1998) and "Clāvis (Kagi)" (2006).

Background
Kudo came up with the idea for the album when she attended one of Nakajima's concerts during the Miyuki Nakajima Concert Tour 2007 tour in November 2007, and recognized the timeless nature of Nakajima's music. Her rediscovered appreciation for Nakajima's songs is what prompted Kudo to propose and pursue the idea of recording an entire album of Miyuki Nakajima covers.

For the album, Kudo picked songs of Nakajima's that were dear to her and that she wanted to sing herself. She recorded thirty covers, of which only eleven made the final cut of the album. The album contains three original songs of Kudo's written by Nakajima as bonus tracks. "I wanted to take Nakajima's powerful songs and put a lighter spin on them and create my own renditions," Kudo tells Oricon in an interview. She explained further: "You don't sing Miyuki [Nakajima]'s songs from your diaphragm, you have to sing from your guts". She joked that her idea of bringing a lighter touch to the songs went up in flames because of that dimension of Nakajima's music requires your full concentration. Kudo singled out "Inochi no Betsumei" as the most emotionally demanding song to record, bringing her almost to tears in the studio.

Critical reception
Kudo was praised for bringing her "A-game" as a vocalist to the task of performing Nakajima's songs. The songs' arrangement and production were also acclaimed for being "solid and unpretentious". The bonus tracks were cited as a good show of Kudo's evolution as a vocalist.

Commercial performance
My Precious: Shizuka Sings Songs of Miyuki debuted at number 20 on the Oricon Albums Chart, with 6,000 units sold. The album charted in the top 300 for a total of five weeks, selling a reported 13,000 copies during its chart run.

Track listing

Charts

References

External links
 My Precious: Shizuka Sings Songs of Miyuki on Pony Canyon's official website

2008 albums
Covers albums
Shizuka Kudo albums
Pony Canyon albums